Kent Peak  is a summit in the U.S. state of Idaho, with an elevation of .

Kent Peak was named after a pioneer trapper.

See also

 Kent Peak (Boulder Mountains, Idaho) - The other Kent peak in Idaho
 List of mountains of Idaho
 List of mountain peaks of Idaho
 List of mountain ranges in Idaho
 List of U.S. states by elevation

References

External links

Mountains of Idaho
Mountains of Boundary County, Idaho